Gizmo Mantra is the fifth studio album released by Australian rock group Boom Crash Opera. The album was released in November 1997.

Reception 

Kelvin Hayes from All Music said; "It takes a while to warm up to, and it is a patchy thing even then, but Gizmo is possibly their best work since These Here Are Crazy Times in 1989. Peter Farnan is up to his usual oddball but inventive best on "Don't Forget to Breathe" and the excellent "Welcome to Tomorrow." Former writing partner Richard Pleasance helps out on "Dreaming up a Fire' (a re-take of the earlier hit "Dancing in the Storm"). The driving rock of "(So How Do I Turn You) On" is a brilliant endgame but for Farnan's musical acrobatics on the tail piece. The set is ruined by carelessness such as the '70s dirge "All". Plenty of Gizmo, little sign of a mantra."

Track listing 
 "Wake Up Fine" – 4:09
 "Dirt" – 3:27
 "Don't Forget to Breathe" – 4:12
 "Welcome to Tomorrow" – 3:41
 "All" – 4:14
 "Walking Disaster" – 4:07
 "Funny" – 3:23
 "Bad Television" – 3:27
 "Ain't I Amazed" – 4:33
 "I'm Not Like You" – 3:51
 "Dreaming Up a Fire" – 3:46
 "(So How Do I Turn You) On" – 5:31

References 

1997 albums
Boom Crash Opera albums
Bertelsmann Music Group albums
Gotham Records albums